The 1975 NCAA Division II baseball tournament decided the champion of baseball at the NCAA Division II level for the 1975 season.  This was the eighth such tournament for the Division, having separated from the University Division in 1957, and further dividing into Division II and Division III for the 1975 season.  The  won the championship by defeating .

Regionals

Northeast Regional

South Atlantic Regional

Mideast Regional

South Regional

Midwest Regional

West Regional

Finals

Participants

Results

See also
 1975 NCAA Division I baseball tournament
 1975 NAIA World Series

References

 
NCAA Division II Baseball Tournament
NCAA Division II baseball tournament